Pleurothyrium roberto-andinoi is a species of plant in the family Lauraceae. It is endemic to Honduras.

References

Lauraceae
Endemic flora of Honduras
Critically endangered flora of North America
Taxonomy articles created by Polbot
Plants described in 1992